Dactylorhiza incarnata, the early marsh-orchid, is a perennial, temperate-climate species of orchid generally found growing in wet meadows, and generally on base-rich soils, up to about 2100m asl. The species occurs widely in Europe and Asia from Portugal and Ireland east to Siberia and Xinjiang.

There are several subspecies and also hybrids, rendering the identification of this species more difficult, but typically, the flowering spike is robust with a hollow stem, 25–60 cm tall, and bearing up to 50 flowers. Plants grow to a height of from 15 to 70 cm. The 4–7 erect yellowish-green leaves are hooded at the tip. The inflorescence is 4–12 cm long, with up to 50 blooms. The labellum appears long and narrow, since its sides are strongly reflexed (folded back). The tip is shallowly three-lobed. The flower is often flesh-coloured (the meaning of incarnata) and the labellum normally has loop-shaped markings.

The flowering period is from May to mid-July, dependent on latitude and subspecies.

Subspecies
Many names have been proposed for subspecies, varieties and forms within the species. Subspecies recognized as of June 2014:

 Dactylorhiza incarnata subsp. coccinea – British Isles
 Dactylorhiza incarnata subsp. cruenta – from France and Ireland east to Siberia and Xinjiang
 Dactylorhiza incarnata subsp. gemmana  – Great Britain, Ireland, Germany, Netherlands
 Dactylorhiza incarnata subsp. incarnata – from Spain and Ireland east to Siberia and Kazakhstan
Dactylorhiza incarnata subsp. jugicrucis – Transcaucasus
 Dactylorhiza incarnata nothosubsp. krylovii ined. – France and Western Siberia
 Dactylorhiza incarnata subsp. lobelii – Denmark, Norway, Netherlands
 Dactylorhiza incarnata subsp. ochroleuca – British Isles, Sweden, France, Germany, Switzerland, Austria, Baltic Republics 
 Dactylorhiza incarnata subsp. pulchella – British Isles, Sweden, France, Austria, Czech Republic
 Dactylorhiza incarnata nothosubsp. versicolor – Germany and Austria  (D. incarnata subsp. incarnata × D. incarnata subsp. ochroleuca)

Hybrids have been reported between D. incarnata and D. maculata, D. praetermissa, D. purpurella and D. kerryensis.

References 

 Turner Ettlinger, D.M. (1976) British and Irish Orchids: a field guide
 Buttler, Karl Peter (1986) Orchideen: die wildwachsenden Arten und Unterarten Europas, Vorderasiens und Nordafrikas.
 Lang, David (1980) Orchids of Britain: a field guide.
 Fitter, A.(1978) An Atlas of the Wild Flowers of Britain and Northern Europe.

External links 
 
 
  Den virtuella floran - Distribution (excluding ssp. cruenta
 

incarnata
Orchids of Europe
Orchids of Asia
Plants described in 1755